Alena Dernerová (born 13 September 1958) is a Czech politician and pediatric neurologist. An independent, Dernerová became Senator for Most as a result of the 2010 Czech Senate election, ahead of Social Democrat Zdeněk Brabec in the second round of voting. She was affiliated with the Severočeši.cz movement.

References

External links
 adernerova.cz  – Official website 

1958 births
Living people
People from Most District
Members of the Senate of the Czech Republic
Czech neurologists
Czech pediatricians
Charles University alumni